Pennoyer may refer to:

People with the surname
Peter Pennoyer (born 1957), American architect
Sylvester Pennoyer (1831–1902), American politician
William Pennoyer (1603–1670), British businessman and philanthropist

Other
Pennoyer v. Neff, US legal case.